Caladenia callitrophila, commonly known as the Berrigan spider orchid is a plant in the orchid family Orchidaceae and is endemic to a small area in New South Wales. It has a single leaf and one or two pale greenish-yellow flowers with red markings and only occurs in  three small populations.

Description
The labellum curves forward and downwards and there are six to nine pairs of red teeth on its sides. Flowering occurs from September to October.

Taxonomy and naming
Caladenia callitrophila was first formally described by David L. Jones in 1999 and the description was published in The Orchadian from a specimen collected near Berrigan. The specific epithet (callitrophila) is derived from the name of cypress pines in the genus Callitris. This orchid grows in Callitris woodland.

Distribution and habitat
Berrigan orchid occurs in three small scattered populations near Berrigan where it grows in Callistris woodland.

References

callitrophila
Plants described in 1999
Endemic orchids of Australia
Orchids of New South Wales
Taxa named by David L. Jones (botanist)